Prataprao or Pratap Rao is a Marathi given name. Notable people with the name include:

Prataprao Gujar, 17th century Indian military commander 
Prataprao Ganpatrao Jadhav, Indian politician 
Prataprao Govindrao Chikhalikar, Indian politician

Indian masculine given names